Chippagiri is a mandal located in the Kurnool district of Andhra Pradesh, India.

History

The Chippagiri village was previously named Bhaskara Shrine because a sage named Bhaskara Muni was known to have carried out prayers on the hill.

It is believed that the shrine was moved to Hampi due to severe water problems and the shrine was renamed from Shilpagiri to Chippagiri (also known as Andhra Hampi). The temples of Virupaksheswara and Chennekeswara were first built in Chippagiri.

Many sculptures can be found in Chippagiri's temples. In the earlier days, there were 101 wells and 101 statues of Lord Shiva (linga).

The people from Hindu and Muslim religions maintained good relationships without any conflicts. They all mixed together and participated in the festivals of both their religions and they implemented freedom of religion.

5th Century A.D Architecture Design in Jain Temple on the Hill of Shilpagiri (Chippagiri)

The temple of Hindu religion named Bhogeswara temple was famous. This temple was visited by the Vijayanagara Empire Sri Krishna Devaraya, history tells us.

Not only the Hindu temples but the Muslim religion god named, BhamBham Baba Swamiji and Sattarvali Swamiji prayer halls were there. The people of this village celebrated the festival of Bhom Bhom Baba with much joy. These celebrations were held up to 30 days.

The Boghalingeswara Swamy temple and standing pillar

Boghalingeswara temple, the standing pillar which has been built in front of the temple and the Uyyala Mandapam, new Ratham worth Rs.6 lakhs were designed by them. In this village, the festival was celebrated (in the Andhra Hampi) which is called as Chippagiri Brahmostavam celebrations held extraordinarily. Kings have now gone and kingdoms have also gone but those temples welcome arches, standing pillars which have been built by artistic nature remained safely.

Kandanavolu, now known to us as Kurnool district. 
Chippagiri is one of the smallest villages in the Rayalaseema region. This village was called as an Andhra Hampi the festivals were celebrated in Hampi and the Chippagiri held in the same day, this is one of the great things.

This temple is having 3 Basaveswara statues the Mughal king Aurangzeb has been opposed the cult of statues and he cut down the heads of Basavannas. The new Basavanna statue was reinstated in front of previous statues to avoid dosha (dosha nivarana) believed by them.

The 3 Basavana statues in Baghalingeswara temple

The temples built by Sri Krishna Devaraya, those who visited them believe their sins have gone away.

Nature's gift and one of the famous temples in Andhra Pradesh named Kasapuram Nettikanti Anjaneya temple. Chippagiri is nearly 15 km distance from Kasapuram, which is 5 km from Guntakal. In 1500 A.D. Sri Krishnadevaraya has been faced the threat of Kuhu. To avoid this threat the Vyasaraya took the throne of kingdom for a while. After that, he travelled to different places and finally arrived at Shilpagiri (now known as Chippagiri).  While he stayed overnight in this village, the lord Anjaneya Swamy came into his dreams and said to built temples in these surroundings.

The temples which have been built by Sri Krishnadevaraya denoted their status. And they still remain as proof.

The scripture on statues in Chennakeswara temple

During the reign of Gundappa Devera to Sri Krishna Devaraya they ruled the Chippagiri region. Now 101 temples and 101 Sivalingas were reinstated in their work. The Rayala's favourite God Chennakeswara temple was also here. Meanwhile, the Tirupathi Lord Venkateswara Swamy and Padmavati Amma's statues comparable to Thimmappa Swamy temple 60-foot stone standing pillar another one is also Hampi. Parvathi parameswara Uyala Mandapam is an extraordinary one. Elephant, the only statue which is having different kinds of angles the visible scenes displayed the architecture of artistic skills in earlier days.

The Kasapuram Anjaneya Swamy statue was the same as which was built by the Vyasaraya in Chippagiri.

The Sattar Sab Dargah in Chippagiri

Hazrat-Sultan-Mohiddien Khadi (Boom Bhom Baba) to visit these Dargah people came from the states of Andhra Pradesh, Karnataka, Maharastra, Approximately 400 years back the Sayyad Abdul Sattarhadi Khadi came from Arabia to India and travelled different places and finally came to Chippagiri.

The Sayyadsha Abdul Sattarhadi belonged to Mohammad Pravaktha's family and a great-grandson. The people prayed to Bham Bham Baba across the country Sayyad Ushhaki Ahmed Basha Khadri is the only child and grownup with God's thoughts since his childhood.
Through his preachings, thousands of people came to listen and devoted to him. Through Bham Bham Baba's magical powers many people who don't have children are now having children. Not only this, but the also turned and lighted the light with water and the liquor was turned to milk.

The Dargah of Nabi Dastagiri in Chippagiri

The Sayyadsha Abdul Sattar Khadri died in 1910. Since that year the Bham Bham Baba festival celebrations were held every year and his family spoke to the people. The people visited him and their problems were solved through the belief of the devotees. Bham Baba was the great grandfather of Abdul Sattar Hadi Khadri the resident of Macca he went to Macca 70 times.

The welcome gate of Vijayadasa

Bhaskara Shrine: Earlier Bhaskara Shrine is known as Shiplagiri. In 1752 A.D. The temple of Bogeswara visited by him which was built in Chippagiri. He stayed few days there. At present, the sacred water (known as Vijayateertham) the stone statue of Sri Venugopal Swamy has been picked out and he was done so many Archanas and Poojas to that statue.

In every year the day of karthika suddha dasami the worshippings was held by the devotees in the presence of Sri C.H. Jaganadha das and the family of Swamy held prestigiously.

For these worshipping people come from Andhra Karnataka, Tamil Nadu statues, the devotees got the Swamiji's anugraham. Not only in the worshipping but also in every session devotees came to visit the Swamy and get the prasadams and return towards their places.

The Suseendra Teertha Swamiji worshipping the Vijayadasa

The devotees who went to Mantralayam and in their return journey they visit the Swamiji, the person who started Carnatic music Sri Purandara Dasa disciples.

Chippagiri is known for Vijaya Dasa (1682–1755) famous for his Daasa Saahitya who lived here for sometime at the Sri Anjaneya Swamy temple consecrated by Sri Vyasaraja, and reached the Haripada (to reach God or die) here famously known as Vijayadasara Katte.

References 

Villages in Kurnool district